The Raigam Tele'es Best Teledrama Script Award is a Raigam Tele'es award presented annually in Sri Lanka by the Kingdom of Raigam companies for the best Sri Lankan script writer of the year in television.

The award was first given in 2005.

Award list in each year

References

Performing arts awards
Raigam Tele'es